Conway Range is a mountain range in the Cook Mountains between Mulock Glacier and Carlyon Glacier. The range was discovered by the British National Antarctic Expedition, 1901–04, but the name appears to be first used in the reports of the British Antarctic Expedition, 1907–09.

Features
Mount Chalmers
Mount Keltie (2,640 m)
Mount Kosko (1,795 m)
Mount Willis
Bertoglio Glacier

References
 

Mountain ranges of Oates Land